Garrison Hill Tower is a  observatory atop Garrison Hill in Dover, New Hampshire, United States. The current tower, made of iron and painted green, was built in 1993 and is the third tower to exist on the hill.  The park in which it stands is listed on the National Register of Historic Places.

Setting
Garrison Hill Park is located north of downtown Dover, on the east side of New Hampshire Route 9. The park occupies about  around the summit, and is accessed via Abbie Sawyer Memorial Highway. The road leads to a parking area at the summit, providing access to the observation tower, a town-owned concrete water storage tank, and radio transmission towers.

History
In 1880, the top of Garrison Hill was purchased by Joseph Ham and Harrison Haley, who developed it as a public park.  Haley purchased—for $1,000—a  wooden observatory designed by architect B. D. Stewart and opened it to the public.  The observatory contained a restaurant in the base, and offered a telescope through which the public could view Mount Washington.  The city acquired the property in 1888 and continued to operate it as a public park.  The city also built a reservoir (since filled in) on the site.

After the wooden observatory burned down in 1911, Abbey Sawyer commissioned a replacement, made of steel, to honor her husband.  She also funded the construction of a new roadway (the present Abbey Sawyer Memorial Drive) to the summit, replacing the 1880 carriage road (now a footpath).  The tower, erected in 1913, was taken down in 1990 due to safety concerns, and a third tower (the one now standing) was built by volunteers.  On a clear day, one can view the White Mountains and the Isles of Shoals from atop the tower.

See also
National Register of Historic Places listings in Strafford County, New Hampshire

References

Buildings and structures on the National Register of Historic Places in New Hampshire
Buildings and structures in Dover, New Hampshire
National Register of Historic Places in Strafford County, New Hampshire
Towers in New Hampshire
Parks in New Hampshire